The 1917 Williams Ephs football team represented Williams College as an independent during the 1917 college football season. In their first and only season under head coach Mysterious Walker, the Ephs compiled a record of 7–0–1. Quarterback Benny Boynton led the squad to its first undefeated record. Boynton scored all the points in a 9–6 defeat of Columbia.

Schedule

References

Williams
Williams Ephs football seasons
College football undefeated seasons
Williams Ephs football